The 2002–03 Anycall Professional Basketball season was the seventh season of the Korean Basketball League.

Regular season

Playoffs

Prize money
Wonju TG Xers: KRW 120,000,000 (champions + regular-season 3rd place)
Daegu Tongyang Orions: KRW 100,000,000 (runners-up + regular-season 1st place)
Changwon LG Sakers: KRW 30,000,000 (regular-season 2nd place)

External links
Official KBL website (Korean & English)

2002–03
2002–03 in South Korean basketball
2002–03 in Asian basketball leagues